Cahuenga Peak is the 12th-highest named peak in the Santa Monica Mountains and is located just west of the Hollywood Sign. It provides a spectacular 360-degree panorama of the Los Angeles Basin and the San Fernando Valley for those hikers willing to climb the roadless peak.

History
Howard Hughes acquired the peak and surrounding acreage in the 1940s with plans to build a house for his love interest, actress Ginger Rogers. Rogers broke up their engagement, so the area was left undeveloped.  In 2002, a group of Chicago-area investors named Fox River Financial Resources purchased the  parcel along the ridge including Cahuenga Peak from the Hughes Estate for $1,675,000 according to Los Angeles County property records.  The investors considered constructing five luxury estates on the property.

Conservation

Los Angeles city officials said City Hall had received hundreds of letters pleading for the peak's protection, which prompted a campaign by city leaders and conservationists to raise $6,000,000 which they thought would be sufficient to buy Cahuenga Peak and turn it into an extension of nearby Griffith Park.
On February 13, 2008, Fox River Financial Resources released plans to sell the property for $22 million.

That same month, The Trust for Public Land launched the "Save Cahuenga Peak" campaign to purchase the land from the investment firm for $12.5 million.  As part of the campaign they draped the Hollywood Sign so that it read "SAVE THE PEAK". On April 26 it was announced that the campaign was successful. Though funds came from many sources, including $1.7 million in public money, it was the final-hour donations of $500,000 from The Louis Comfort Tiffany Foundation and Aileen Getty and $900,000 from Hugh Hefner that enabled the purchase. In July 2010, more than  around Cahuenga Peak was officially added to Griffith Park.

The peak is home to the rare Plummer's mariposa lily, a population of coast horned lizards, and the echo blue butterfly.

Hiking 
The Aileen Getty Ridge Trail allows hikers to ascend Cahuenga Peak from the east or west approaches. From the west, the trail approaches from Burbank Peak, from the east Mount Lee.

See also
Santa Monica Mountains topics index

References

External links
 
  
 
 

Santa Monica Mountains
Protected areas of Los Angeles County, California
Mountain ranges of Southern California